Meridian (pronounced muh-REE-dee-uhn by locals) is a city and the county seat of Bosque County in central Texas, United States.  It is forty-seven miles northwest of Waco. The population was 1,493 at the 2010 census.

Geography

Meridian is located at  (31.92, –97.66).

Climate
The climate in this area is characterized by hot, humid summers and generally mild to cool winters.  According to the Köppen Climate Classification system, Meridian has a humid subtropical climate, abbreviated "Cfa" on climate maps.

Demographics

2020 census

As of the 2020 United States census, there were 1,396 people, 673 households, and 427 families residing in the city.

2000 census
As of the census of 2000, there were 1,491 people, 515 households, and 358 families living in the city. The population density was 689.3 people per square mile (266.5/km). There were 600 housing units at an average density of 277.4/sq mi (107.3/km). The racial makeup of the city was 83.43% White, 5.37% African American, 0.27% Native American, 0.07% Asian, 8.18% from other races, and 2.68% from two or more races. Hispanic or Latino of any race were 23.00% of the population.

There were 515 households, out of which 36.9% had children under the age of 18 living with them, 52.0% were married couples living together, 13.2% had a female householder with no husband present, and 30.3% were non-families. 28.3% of all households were made up of individuals, and 16.9% had someone living alone who was 65 years of age or older. The average household size was 2.66 and the average family size was 3.27.

In the city, the population was spread out, with 28.7% under the age of 18, 7.7% from 18 to 24, 26.3% from 25 to 44, 17.4% from 45 to 64, and 19.9% who were 65 years of age or older. The median age was 36 years. For every 100 females, there were 87.5 males. For every 100 females age 18 and over, there were 83.9 males.

The median income for a household in the city was $32,750, and the median income for a family was $40,625. Males had a median income of $30,179 versus $20,227 for females. The per capita income for the city was $17,258. About 10.8% of families and 14.4% of the population were below the poverty line, including 13.5% of those under age 18 and 27.4% of those age 65 or over.

Education
Meridian is served by the Meridian Independent School District and is home to Meridian High School.

Notable people

 Torrence Allen, NFL player played for the San Diego Chargers from 2014 to 2017
 Earle Bradford Mayfield, U.S. senator from Texas from 1923 to 1929, practiced law in Meridian early in his career
 Frank Pollard, NFL player played for the Pittsburgh Steelers in the 1980s

Photo gallery

References

External links
 Meridian Chamber of Commerce

Cities in Texas
County seats in Texas
Cities in Bosque County, Texas